Kim Clijsters was the defending champion but did not compete that year.

Dinara Safina won in the final 6–4, 2–6, 6–3 against Amélie Mauresmo.

Seeds
A champion seed is indicated in bold text while text in italics indicates the round in which that seed was eliminated. The top four seeds received a bye to the second round.

  Serena Williams (quarterfinals)
  Amélie Mauresmo (final)
  Maria Sharapova (withdrew)
  Nadia Petrova (semifinals)
  Nathalie Dechy (second round)
  Karolina Šprem (first round)
  Silvia Farina Elia (quarterfinals)
  Magdalena Maleeva (quarterfinals)

Draw

Final

Section 1

Section 2

External links
 2005 Open Gaz de France Draw

Singles
Open Gaz de France